B-lymphocyte antigen CD20 or CD20 is expressed on the surface of all B-cells beginning at the pro-B phase (CD45R+, CD117+) and progressively increasing in concentration until maturity.

In humans CD20 is encoded by the MS4A1 gene.

This gene encodes a member of the membrane-spanning 4A gene family. Members of this nascent protein family are characterized by common structural features and similar intron/exon splice boundaries and display unique expression patterns among hematopoietic cells and nonlymphoid tissues. This gene encodes a B-lymphocyte surface molecule that plays a role in the development and differentiation of B-cells into plasma cells. This family member is localized to 11q12, among a cluster of family members. Alternative splicing of this gene results in two transcript variants that encode the same protein.

Function 
The protein has no known natural ligand and its function is to enable optimal B-cell immune response, specifically against T-independent antigens. It is suspected that it acts as a calcium channel in the cell membrane. CD20 is induced in the context of microenvironmental interactions by CXCR4/SDF1 (CXCL12) chemokine signaling and the molecular function of CD20 has been linked to the signaling propensity of B-cell receptor (BCR) in this context.

Expression 
CD20 is expressed on all stages of B cell development except the first and last; it is present from late pro-B cells through memory cells, but not on either early pro-B cells or plasma blasts and plasma cells. It is found on B-cell lymphomas, hairy cell leukemia, B-cell chronic lymphocytic leukemia, and melanoma cancer stem cells. 

Immunohistochemistry can be used to determine the presence of CD20 on cells in histological tissue sections. Because CD20 remains present on the cells of most B-cell neoplasms, and is absent on otherwise similar appearing T-cell neoplasms, it can be very useful in diagnosing conditions such as B-cell lymphomas and leukaemias. However, the presence or absence of CD20 in such tumours is not relevant to prognosis, with the progression of the disease being much the same in either case. CD20 positive cells are also sometimes found in cases of Hodgkins disease, myeloma, and thymoma.

Antibody FMC7 (Flinders Medical Centre) appears to recognise a conformational variant of CD20 also known as the FMC7 antigen.

Clinical significance 
CD20 is the target of the monoclonal antibodies rituximab, ocrelizumab, obinutuzumab, ofatumumab, ibritumomab tiuxetan, tositumomab, and ublituximab, which are all active agents in the treatment of all B cell lymphomas, leukemias, and B cell-mediated autoimmune diseases. 
  
The anti-CD20 mAB ofatumumab (Genmab) was approved by FDA in October 2009 for chronic lymphocytic leukemia.

The anti-CD20 mAB obinutuzumab (Gazyva) was approved by FDA in November 2013 for chronic lymphocytic leukemia.

Ocrelizumab was approved by the FDA in March 2017 for multiple sclerosis as the first treatment of the primary progressive form of MS. Clinical trials in rheumatoid arthritis and systemic lupus erythematosus  were discontinued in 2010 due to an infection related safety risk.

Although phase II trials for the use of Rituximab in myalgic encephalomyelitis showed promising results, these could not be replicated in a large randomized controlled trial  and preliminary results from a Phase III trial were negative. 

Additional anti-CD20 antibody therapeutics under development (phase II or III clinical trials in 2008) include :
Obinutuzumab for systemic lupus erythematosus,
Ocaratuzumab for follicular lymphoma and rheumatoid arthritis,
TRU-015 (by Trubion), (discontinued in 2010)
IMMU-106 (veltuzumab). for non-Hodgkin's lymphoma or (2015) immune thrombocytopenia.

B cells, CD20, and diabetes mellitus
A link between the immune system's B cells and diabetes mellitus has been determined. In cases of obesity, the presence of fatty tissues surrounding the body's major organ systems results in cell necrosis and insulin desensitivity along the boundary between them. Eventually, the contents of fat cells that would otherwise have been digested by insulin are shed into the bloodstream. An inflammation response that mobilizes both T and B cells results in the creation of antibodies against these cells, causing them to become less responsive to insulin by an as-yet-unknown mechanism and promoting hypertension, hypertriglyceridemia, and arteriosclerosis, hallmarks of the metabolic syndrome. Obese mice administered anti-B cell CD-20 antibodies, however, did not become less responsive to insulin and as a result, did not develop diabetes mellitus or the metabolic syndrome, the posited mechanism being that anti-CD20 antibodies rendered the T cell antibodies dysfunctional and therefore powerless to cause insulin desensitivity by a B cell antibody-modulated autoimmune response. The protection afforded by anti-CD-20 lasted approximately forty days—the time it takes the body to replenish its supply of B cells—after which repetition was necessary to restore it. Hence, it has been argued that diabetes mellitus be reclassified as an autoimmune disease rather than a purely metabolic one and focus treatment for it on immune system modulation.

References

Further reading

External links 
 
 representations of the shape are found here and more detail here
 
 

Clusters of differentiation